Railmotor is a term used in the United Kingdom and elsewhere for a railway lightweight railcar, usually consisting of a railway carriage with a steam traction unit, or a diesel or petrol engine, integrated into it.

Steam railcars

Overview
In the earliest days of railways, designers wished to produce a vehicle for passenger carrying that was economical to build and operate on routes where passenger numbers were light. A single coach with its own prime mover was a solution adopted in some cases; this may be thought of as the predecessor to the railcar, a term more associated with the use of internal combustion engines.

William Bridges Adams started building railmotors in small numbers as early as 1848. The Bristol and Exeter Railway used a steam carriage.

In most cases the early designs were unsuccessful technically, but in the early years of the twentieth century, street-running passenger tramways started to use small steam engines to draw tramcars, replacing the customary horse traction. In many cases the tramways soon adopted electric traction instead, and the attractiveness of the cheap and frequent conveyance abstracted business from the railways in urban areas.

The railways responded by opening new stopping places (to serve more closely the new suburban housing) and sought to reduce their operating cost by reintroducing railmotors, which were cheaper to construct.

The London and North Western Railway, Lancashire and Yorkshire Railway, London, Brighton and South Coast Railway, Great North of Scotland Railway and Great Western Railway introduced them.

Nonetheless, the railmotors had a number of disadvantages: their frequency, and the closeness of their stopping places, could not match that of the tramcars. The intrinsic compromises in fitting a steam engine inside the limited space available made them mechanically inefficient, and their power was (in most designs) insufficient to handle attached vehicles for parcels or additional coaches at times of exceptional demand such as public holidays; and in nearly all cases they still required a three-man crew (driver, fireman and guard), a significant expense compared with the single crew member of a tramcar. 

They also encountered operational and maintenance problems on railways used to treating locomotives and carriages as separate entities: Servicing the prime mover in a locomotive shed or workshop frequently made the carriage body and interior dirty, and some railmotor designs required that some mechanical work be carried out from inside the carriage portion which aggravated the problem. Stabling railmotors in carriage sheds meant introducing the unit's smoke, steam, ash and dust into a relatively clean environment and requiring more effort to keep not only the railmotor but other carriages stabled alongside it suitably clean, and carriage sheds did not have staff trained in servicing and maintaining the power units of railmotors. Some railways invested in dedicated sheds to store and service railmotors, but this merely introduced additional running and manning costs which further reduced the railmotors' supposed economy of operation.

Designs

There were two basic designs:
 A small 0-4-0 or 0-2-2 steam locomotive with one end of a coach hung on it like an articulated lorry.
 A coach with a steam engine built into one end of it.  This type would sometimes have a vertical boiler.

These machines were not a great success because they lacked flexibility. Most could haul a single trailer, but no more. This meant they were unable to cope with greater than expected passenger demands – a classic example being busy market days on an otherwise lightly used rural branch line. They were also unable to haul goods wagons, requiring a conventional locomotive to be stationed on the same line in any case for these duties. In several cases railmotors were victims of their own success - the increased service frequency and more modern rolling stock that the railmotors provided, plus the opening of additional halts along lines that were often part of a conversion to railmotor operation, lead to significant increases in passenger numbers and loadings, requiring the addition of driving trailers to meet demand which overtaxed the low-powered machinery of many railmotor designs, especially on routes with steep gradients. For this reason, they were largely superseded by push-pull trains and the GWR converted some of their railmotors into autocoaches for this purpose. The South Eastern and Chatham Railway built its P Class of small, light tank locomotives specifically to replace railmotors in the 1900s, while the London and South Western Railway introduced its C14 Class which were essentially self-contained railmotor power units that allowed greater flexibility by separating the engine and the carriage sections for working as push-pull trains.

In the late 1920s, there was another revival of railmotors with the introduction of new designs from Clayton and Sentinel with high-speed motors and geared drive.  The London and North Eastern Railway bought over 80 of them but, again, they were short-lived. Some lasted no more than 10 years and all had been withdrawn by 1947.

From the 1930s, the diesel railcar made great progress and by the 1950s the railmotor was consigned to history. The diesel's ability to use multiple unit control was an advantage.

Heritage examples
United Kingdom
The Great Western Society, based at Didcot, has restored a Great Western Railway steam railmotor, built in 1908, to working condition. It regularly operates throughout the summer and has visited other preserved railways in the west country and Wales. It also operated on the mainline between Liskeard and Looe in November 2012.

Another mostly complete example is a Midland Railway railmotor, which was later turned into an Officers' Saloon for inspection duties. It lasted in preservation from 1968 as a holiday home, then went to the National Railway Museum where inadequate outside storage led to its deterioration. It was later moved to a farm in 2015 and remains there as of May 2019.

In Northern Ireland, the heritage Downpatrick and County Down Railway (D&CDR) owns an example of a Belfast and County Down Railway railmotor which was converted to an autotrain driving trailer while in service. After withdrawal it was used as private accommodation in a field before being restored to working order. The D&CDR also has Great Southern and Western Railway No. 90, which was built in 1875 as a railmotor but had its carriage portion removed in 1915.

Australia
(In Australia, the term "railmotor" was used in those states, especially New South Wales, with a strongly British-influenced railway tradition. It was applied to diesel or petrol-powered self-propelled passenger carriages otherwise termed "railcars" on Australian railways where a more American tradition applied, such as the Commonwealth Railways and South Australian Railways. Examples of New South Wales railmotors were the 400 and 500 class and the CPH class "tin hares", and in Victoria the Walker railmotor. Similar vehicles in South Australia, the Brill 75 class, were termed "railcars".)

A 1905-vintage, British-built steam railmotor is operated on the Pichi Richi Railway: the former South Australian Railways Steam Motor Coach (SMC) no. 1, the only example of its type operating in the world. The engine unit, built by Kitson and Company of Leeds, England, consists of a small saturated locomotive-type boiler and a cab fitted on a four-wheel (720 mm diameter) underframe. Two outside cylinders delivering  of tractive effort drive the rear axle, which is the only one powered; valve gear is Walschaerts.  The coach unit,  finished in dark oak-stained and varnished timber, was built by the Metropolitan Amalgamated Railway Carriage and Wagon Company of Birmingham. The first class compartment has elaborate pressed ceiling patterns and carpeted floor; second class has a plain ceiling and linoleum flooring. Seating is upholstered with mock leather; nine first class seats and thirteen second class are in separate compartments.

SMC no. 1 was nicknamed the "Coffee Pot" after railwaymen chalked "Coffee" and "Cocoa" on two water barrels that had been placed on the running boards on either side as a spare water supply; the term persists today.

The South Australian Railways inaugurated the vehicle in August 1906 on the narrow-gauge Great Northern Division; a similar unit went to the South East Division. Its regular duty was a weekly trip to Hawker, 65 km (40 mi) away, hauling a four-wheel van to carry parcels and mail. It was hired for charter on weekends, often by tennis and football clubs. It spent its entire working life operating out of the Quorn locomotive depot until 1932, when it was stored and, later, publicly displayed at Port Augusta and Alice Springs. In 1975 it was returned to Quorn for restoration to working order by the Pichi Richi Railway Preservation Society. After extensive work, it was returned to service in 1984 and now operates at regular intervals.

Fleets

See also
 Autorail
 British steam railcars
 Railbus
 Railcar
 Motor coach (rail)

Notes

References

Further reading

External links
 History of GWR railmotors and autocoaches
 The GWR Steam Railmotor Project
 Pichi Richi Railway